Howmeh Rural District is in the Central District of Ferdows County, South Khorasan province, Iran. At the National Census of 2006, its population was 2,286 in 625 households. There were 2,378 inhabitants in 698 households at the following census of 2011. At the most recent census of 2016, the population of the rural district was 2,561 in 810 households. The largest of its 142 villages was Khanekuk, with 1,099 people.

References 

Ferdows County

Rural Districts of South Khorasan Province

Populated places in South Khorasan Province

Populated places in Ferdows County